Caesar is a surname. It most commonly refers to Julius Caesar (100 BC–44 BC), a Roman general and statesman.

Other notable people with the surname include:

 Adolph Caesar (1933–1986), American actor
 Alfred Augustus Levi Caesar (1914-1995), English geographer
 Arthur Caesar (1892–1953), American screenwriter
 Bill Caesar (1899–1988), English cricketer
 Burt Caesar, British actor, broadcaster and director
 David Caesar (born 1963), Australian television director, film director and writer
 Gus Caesar (born 1966), English footballer
 Hans-Joachim Caesar (1905–1990), German Bank Comptroller in Paris, 1940–44
 Irving Caesar (1895–1996), American lyricist and theatre composer
 Ivan Caesar (1967–2008), American football player
 Julius Caesar (judge) (1557/8–1636), British judge and politician (MP for Reigate, Bletchingley, Windsor, Westminster, Middlesex and Maldon)
 Oakley Caesar-Su, better known as Central Cee, British rapper and songwriter
 Pogus Caesar (born 1953), British photographer, conceptual artist, archivist, author, curator, television producer and director
 Robert Caesar (1602–1637), English lawyer and politician
 Shirley Caesar (born 1938), American singer
 Sid Caesar (1922–2014), American comedian and television personality

See also
Caesar (disambiguation), for people known by the title "Caesar"
 Matt Szczur (born 1989), American baseball player whose last name is pronounced identically to the most common English pronunciation of "Caesar"